Banqiao Township (板桥乡) may refer to the following locations in China:

Banqiao Township, Ningguo, in Ningguo City, Anhui
Banqiao Township, Xiuning County, Anhui
Banqiao Township, Youyang County, in Youyang Tujia and Miao Autonomous County, Chongqing
Banqiao Township, Heshui County, in Heshui County, Gansu
Banqiao Township, Linze County, in Linze County, Gansu
Banqiao Township, Wuzhong, in Litong District, Wuzhong, Gansu
Banqiao Township, Zhijin County, in Zhijin County, Guizhou
Banqiao Township, Sinan County, Guizhou, in Sinan County, Guizhou
Banqiao Township, Chenxi County, in Chenxi County, Hunan
Banqiao Township, Guiyang County, in Guiyang County, Hunan
Banqiao Township, Shaoyang, in Daxiang District, Shaoyang, Hunan
Banqiao Township, Hancheng, in Hancheng City, Shaanxi
Banqiao Township, Shangluo, in Shangzhou District, Shangluo, Shaanxi
Banqiao Township, Pengxi County, in Pengxi County, Sichuan
Banqiao Township, Qingchuan County, in Qingchuan County, Sichuan
Banqiao Township, Qu County, in Qu County, Sichuan
Banqiao Township, Renshou County, in Renshou County, Sichuan
Banqiao Township, Yilong County, in Yilong County, Sichuan
Banqiao Township, Yuexi County, Sichuan, in Yuexi County, Sichuan